Jupiter is a modern cultivar of domesticated apple which was developed in England, by crossing a Cox's Orange Pippin with a Starking Delicious apple. According to the Orange Pippin website, it is one of the best Cox-style apples, with somewhat a more robust flavor, but more importantly, much more disease resistant. It is a heavy cropper and has a tendency to biennial bearing if not thinned. It is also frost resistant, and earned the Award of Garden Merit by the Royal Horticultural Society in 1993.

See also
 Topaz (apple)

References

 National Fruit Collection page

Apple cultivars